SYmbiosis Multitasking Based Operating System (SymbOS) is a multitasking operating system for Zilog Z80-based 8-bit computer systems.

Contrary to early 8-bit operating systems it is based on a microkernel, which provides preemptive and priority-oriented multitasking and manages random-access memory (RAM) with a size of up to 1024 KB. SymbOS contains a Microsoft Windows like graphical user interface (GUI), supports hard disks with a capacity of up to 128 GB and can already be booted on an unexpanded Amstrad CPC-6128, a 128K-MSX2 and an Amstrad PCW.

As of August 30, 2017 it is available for the Amstrad CPC series of computers, all MSX models starting from the MSX2 standard, MSX with V9990 graphics chip, all Amstrad PCW models, CPC-TREX, C-ONE and the Enterprise 64/128 computers.

Motivation and rationale 

SymbOS was originally started as an experiment to find out to what extent it is possible to implement a multitasking operating system with a windowed GUI on an 8-bit computer from 1985. GEOS contributed to the motivation, but the structure and features of SymbOS aren't similar to that system. The release in 2006 proved that such a "mini windows" system is possible on a then 20-year-old home computer with only quantitative limitations. SymbOS is one of the largest retro computing software projects of recent years. One of the goals of the project is to allow these old machines to be used like a modern PC, using hardware extensions.

Although only an 8-bit CPU, the Z80 can run a preemptive multitasking operating system. Features such as memory protection, which the Z80 lacks, are not essential in such an OS. For example, AmigaOS also lacks memory protection. The MP/M OS proved that multitasking on the Z80 CPU was possible. Yet, it was generally unavailable for home computers.

While the MOS Technology 6502 cannot move the stack pointer, the Z80 can freely relocate it to any position in memory, which makes it easier to implement preemptive multitasking. The existence of an alternative register set accelerates context switching between tasks dramatically. The restriction of Z80 system to a 64 KB address space can be solved with bank switching. In this way, computers like the Amstrad CPC and PCW, MSX, Enterprise or SAM Coupé can access hundreds or thousands of kilobytes of memory.

Design 
SymbOS includes a microkernel, which can perform task management, memory management and inter-process communication.

Task management 
For task management, a combination of preemptive and cooperative multitasking was chosen, which makes different task priorities possible. Preemptive means that tasks are interrupted after a certain amount of time by the operating system, in order to share the CPU time with other tasks. Cooperatively means that a task stops using CPU time by itself. It does that, if it's finished with its current job or waiting for a certain event. Because of this combination it is possible to assign priorities. Tasks with low priority get CPU time only if all tasks with higher priorities are not then working.

Memory and banking management 

Memory management divides the entire RAM into small 256 byte blocks, which can be assigned dynamically. Applications are always running in a secondary 64 KB RAM bank, where no memory space is occupied by the operating system or the video memory. That makes it possible to reserve up to 63 KB in one piece.

Banking management ensures that the system can administer memory with a size of up to one megabyte, even though the Z80 CPU has only a 16-bit address bus. It makes transparent access to memory and functions placed in other 64 KB banks possible.

Interprocess communication 
Communication between different tasks and the operating system usually does not take place via calls, but is done via messages. This is necessary inside a multitasking environment to avoid organization problems with the stack, global variables and shared system resources. The SymbOS kernel supports synchronous and asynchronous IPC.

File system management 
SymbOS supports the file systems CP/M, AMSDOS, and File Allocation Table (FAT) 12-16-32, on all platforms. With the last one, SymbOS can address mass storage devices with a capacity of up to 128 GB. Also, the ability to administer files with a size of up to 2 GB is uncommon for an 8-bit system. Because of the FAT support data exchange with other computers is quite easy, as most 32 and 64 bit operating systems do support the three FAT file systems.

Interface 

The graphical user interface (GUI) of SymbOS works in a fully object-oriented manner. The look and feel mimics that of Microsoft Windows. It contains the well-known task bar with the clock and the "start" menu and can open up to 32 windows that can be moved, resized and scrolled. The whole system is written in optimized assembly language, meaning that the GUI runs as fast as the host machine supports.

Content of a window is defined with "controls" that are primitive GUI elements such as sliders, check boxes, text lines, buttons or graphics. The background or invisible areas of a window don't need to be saved in a separate bitmap buffer. If an area needs to be restored on the display, its contents will be redrawn instead. This makes SymbOS GUI much more memory-friendly compared to most other 8-bit GUIs.

Applications 
There are several standard applications available for SymbOS, which are designed to resemble similar software available on other operating systems. Examples include Notepad, SymCommander (similar to Norton Commander), SymShell (cmd.exe), SymZilla (Mozilla Firefox), SymPlay (QuickTime), SymAmp (Winamp) and Minesweeper.

Commands 
The following list of commands is supported by SymShell.

 ATTRIB
 CD
 CLS
 COLOR
 COPY
 DATE
 DEL
 DIR
 ECHO
 EXIT
 FULL
 HELP
 MD
 MOVE
 PAUSE
 RD
 REM
 REN
 SIZE
 TIME
 TYPE
 VER

Development and release 
SymbOS was originally developed for the Amstrad CPC. Its modular structure, with strict separation of general and hardware components, makes porting to other Z80-based systems comparatively easy.

The MSX computers starting with the MSX2 standard have been supported since summer 2006. The Amstrad PCW port has been available since August 2007. Versions for the Enterprise 128, the SAM Coupé and such clones of ZXSpectrum as ATM-turbo 2+ and ZX-Evolution/BaseConf are possible, too, as they fulfill the requirements for SymbOS.

By keeping a basic condition for an operating system, the strict separation of hardware and application software by an intermediate layer, SymbOS applications run platform-independently on each computer and doesn't need to be adapted for different systems, with the obvious exception of applications that directly access particular hardware.

See also 
 Contiki
 MSX-DOS
 OS-9

References

External links 
 
 SymbOS installation help file
 SymbOS mailing list
 Page at the CPCWiki
 SymbOS demo video running on a real MSX turboR GT with MP3MSX cartridge

Amstrad CPC
MSX
Hobbyist operating systems